The Jonathan Bailey House is a historic house located on Bath Road in Milo, Yates County, New York.

Description and history 
It is a lighthanded version of a Federal-style residence built in about 1825.

It was listed on the National Register of Historic Places on August 24, 1994.

References

Houses on the National Register of Historic Places in New York (state)
Federal architecture in New York (state)
Houses completed in 1825
Houses in Yates County, New York
National Register of Historic Places in Yates County, New York